The Men's Freestyle 97 kg is a competition featured at the 2018 European Wrestling Championships, and was held in Kaspiysk, Russia on May 4 and May 5.

Medalists

Results 
 Legend
 F — Won by fall

Main Bracket

Repechage

References 
 

Men's Freestyle 97 kg